ECHO, Inc (originally Educational Concerns for Hunger Organization) is a non-profit agro-ecological organization whose mission is to support small-scale farmers through the dissemination of information and seeds. The group operate a bank which preserves and distributes. ECHO also offers training courses and workshops on many topics, including tropical agriculture.

Headquarters and Global Farm
ECHO is headquartered in North Fort Myers, Florida. Its campus includes the "Global Farm and Research Center" a demonstration and research farm, a reference library with a variety of resources about rare agricultural crops and techniques, a seed bank, a tropical fruit nursery with a large collection of bamboo varieties, and a bookstore. The global farm also includes an appropriate technology center developing tools and equipment for small scale farmers. Various parts of the farm demonstrate agriculture in different conditions including highlands, lowlands, semi-arid and a demonstration of the techniques of urban agriculture that have been implemented around the world.

Regional Impact Centers
ECHO operates four Regional Impact Centers to bring agricultural resources to  small-scale farmers  in the areas surrounding Chiang Mai, Thailand, Arusha, Tanzania, and Ouagadougou, Burkina Faso.

Seed distribution
ECHO maintains a collection of useful tropical trees and other plants and provides seed and cuttings, free of charge, to individuals actively involved in development abroad, with the intention that seeds will be harvested from the resulting crops and distributed in the communities.  For example, ECHO disseminates seeds and information about Moringa oleifera, a nutritional plant species useful for providing essential vitamins and minerals for people in developing countries in the tropics. To order seeds from ECHO as an active development worker, create an account on ECHOcommunity.org and request seeds through the website. Free trial packets can only be received once per year.

Technical Notes
ECHO publishes a series of technical notes that cover a variety of topics related to appropriate technology, agroecology and agroforestry.

See also 
Agroecology 
Sustainable development
Appropriate technology

References

External links
ECHO official site

Nature conservation organizations based in the United States
Non-profit organizations based in Florida
Sustainable agriculture
Agroecology
Agroforestry